The 2011 Atlantic hurricane season was the second in a group of three very active Atlantic hurricane seasons, each with 19 named storms. The above-average activity was mostly due to a La Niña that persisted during the previous year. Of the season's 19 tropical storms, only seven strengthened into hurricanes, and only four of those became major hurricanes: Irene, Katia, Ophelia, and Rina. The season officially began on June 1st and ended on November 30th, dates which conventionally delimit the period during each year in which most tropical cyclones develop in the Atlantic Ocean. However, the first tropical storm of the season, Arlene, did not develop until nearly a month later. The final system, Tropical Storm Sean, dissipated over the open Atlantic on November 11.

Due to the presence of a La Niña in the Pacific Ocean, many pre-season forecasts called for an above-average hurricane season. In Colorado State University (CSU)'s spring outlook, the organization called for 16 named storms and 9 hurricanes, of which 4 would intensify further into major hurricanes. On May 19, 2011, the National Oceanic and Atmospheric Administration (NOAA) issued their pre-season forecast, predicting 12–18 named storms, 6–10 hurricanes, and 3–6 major hurricanes. Following a quick start to the season, NOAA subsequently increased their outlook to 14–19 named storms, 7–10 hurricanes, and 3–5 major hurricanes on August 4; CSU made no changes to the number of cyclones forecast throughout the year.

Many tropical cyclones affected land during the 2011 season; most impacts, however, did not result in a significant loss of life or property. On June 29, Arlene made landfall in Mexico near Cabo Rojo, Veracruz, causing over $223 million (2011 USD) damage and killing 22 people. Tropical Storm Harvey moved into the coastline of Central America in mid-August, and three deaths were reported as a result. During the month of September, Tropical Storm Lee and Hurricane Nate moved into the central United States Gulf Coast and central Mexico, respectively; the former led to 18 deaths, and the latter caused 5 fatalities. As an extratropical cyclone, Lee caused significant damage in the form of flooding across the Northeast United States, especially in New York and Pennsylvania. The deadliest and most destructive cyclone of the season developed east of the Lesser Antilles on August 21. Hurricane Irene caused significant impact across some of the Caribbean Islands and United States Eastern Seaboard, leaving about $14.2 billion in damage and resulting in the name's retirement. Overall, the season resulted in 112 deaths and nearly $17.4 billion in damage.

Seasonal forecasts

In advance of, and during, each hurricane season, several forecasts of hurricane activity are issued by national meteorological services, scientific agencies, and noted hurricane experts. These include forecasters from the United States National Oceanic and Atmospheric Administration (NOAA)'s National Hurricane and Climate Prediction Center's, Philip J. Klotzbach, William M. Gray and their associates at Colorado State University (CSU), Tropical Storm Risk, and the United Kingdom's Met Office. The forecasts include weekly and monthly changes in significant factors that help determine the number of tropical storms, hurricanes, and major hurricanes within a particular year. As stated by NOAA and CSU, an average Atlantic hurricane season between 1981 and 2010 contains roughly 12 tropical storms, 6 hurricanes, 3 major hurricanes, and an accumulated cyclone energy (ACE) Index of 66-103 units. ACE is, broadly speaking, a measure of the power of the hurricane multiplied by the length of time it existed, so storms that last a long time or that are particularly strong hurricanes have high ACEs. It is only calculated for full advisories on tropical systems at or exceeding , the threshold for tropical storm strength. NOAA typically categorizes a season as either above-average, average, of below-average based on the cumulative ACE Index; however, the number of tropical storms, hurricanes, and major hurricanes within a hurricane season is considered occasionally as well.

Pre-season forecasts
On December 6, 2010, Tropical Storm Risk (TSR), a public consortium that comprises experts on insurance, risk management and seasonal climate forecasting at University College London, issued an extended-range forecast for the 2011 Atlantic hurricane season, calling for tropical cyclone activity roughly 40% above the 1950–2010 average. The team called for 15.6 (±4.3) tropical storms, 8.4 (±3.0) hurricanes, and 4.0 (±1.7) major hurricanes, with a cumulative ACE Index of 141 (±58). Two days later, Colorado State University issued its first extended-range forecast for the 2011 season. In its report, the organization predicted an above-average hurricane season with 17 named storms, 9 hurricanes, and 5 major hurricanes. In addition, the team expected an ACE value of approximately 165, citing that El Niño conditions had little chance to develop by the start of the season. The team also predicted that there was a higher chance of a tropical cyclone hitting the United States coastline when compared to 2010. TSR released an updated forecast on April 4, lowering the number of predicted cyclones by one. On April 4, 2011, CSU revised their December forecast slightly, predicting 16 named storms, 9 hurricanes, and 5 major hurricanes.

On May 19, 2011, NOAA released their first forecast for the 2011 Atlantic hurricane season. The organization expected 12–18 named storms, 6–10 hurricanes, and 3–6 major hurricanes would form in the Atlantic during 2011, citing above-normal sea surface temperatures, a weakening La Niña, and the effect of the warm regime of the Atlantic multidecadal oscillation. NOAA also stated that, when looking at climate models, "activity comparable to some of the active seasons since 1995" could occur. On May 26, the UK Met Office (UKMO) issued a forecast of a slightly above-average season. They predicted 13 tropical storms with a 70% chance that the number would fall between 10 and 17. However, they did not – and do not – issue forecasts on the number of hurricanes and major hurricanes. The team also predicted an ACE Index of 151 with a 70% chance that the index would be in the range 89 to 212.

Mid-season forecasts
On June 1, CSU released their mid-season predictions, with numbers unchanged from those published in April. Concurrently, the Florida State University Center for Ocean-Atmospheric Prediction Studies (FSU COAPS) issued its third annual Atlantic hurricane season forecast, predicting 17 named storms, 9 hurricanes, and an ACE Index of 163. No prediction for the number of major hurricanes was made. A little over a month later, Weather Services International (WSI) issued their first forecast for the season. A total of 15 named storms, 8 hurricanes, and 4 major hurricanes were expected to develop for the entirety of the season. On August 3, CSU issued a mid-season update, though no change in predictions from their April outlook was made. The following day, NOAA issued their mid-season and final forecast for the season, calling for 14-19 named storms, 7-10 hurricanes, and 3-5 major hurricanes. The increase in numbers when compared to the pre-season forecast was due to the near-record start to the season. TSR also issued their sixth and final outlook on August 4, which increased the number of tropical storms to 16 and the number of hurricanes to 9, but continued to predict that there would be 4 major hurricanes. The final forecast for the 2011 season was issued by WSI on September 21, in which the organization called for 21 named storms, 7 hurricanes, and 4 major hurricanes; the philosophy for the increase in numbers was unchanged from CSU's.

Seasonal summary

The Atlantic hurricane season officially began on June 1, 2011. It was an above average season in which twenty tropical cyclones formed. Nineteen of the twenty depressions attained tropical storm status, tied with 1887, 1995, 2010, and later the 2012 season for the fourth-highest number of named storms since record-keeping began in 1851. Seven of these tropical storms became hurricanes, while four of those hurricanes further intensified into major hurricanes. The season was more active than usual due to lower than average wind shear, warmer than average sea surface temperatures, and the presence of a La Niña. Collectively, the tropical cyclones of this season resulted in nearly $18.5 billion in damage and there were 114 deaths; a majority of it was caused by Hurricane Irene and Tropical Storm Lee. The season officially ended on November 30, 2011.

Tropical cyclogenesis began in the month of June, with Tropical Storm Arlene forming on June 28. After Arlene dissipated on July 1, there was about a two-week lull in activity, before Bret, Cindy, and Don developed in the latter half of July. August was the most active month of the season, featuring eight tropical cyclones – Emily, Franklin, Gert, Harvey, Irene, Tropical Depression Ten, Jose, and Katia. The number of named storms in August was well above the 1944–2010 average of four, and just one short of the record of eight set in 2004 and later in 2012, but the number of hurricanes was below the mean. September was slightly above average, with 5 named storms, 2 hurricanes, and 1 major hurricane and featuring the unnamed tropical storm, Lee, Maria, Nate, Ophelia, and Philippe. The next two months featured one system each, with Rina developing in October and Sean forming in November. Sean was the final storm of the season and became extratropical on November 11.

The season's activity was reflected with an average cumulative ACE rating of 125.

Systems

Tropical Storm Arlene

A tropical wave emerged into the eastern Atlantic on June 13. Tracking westward, the disturbance remained disorganized prior to reaching the western Caribbean. Cyclonic rotation became increasingly evident on satellite imagery, though organization was halted by the disturbance's passage over the Yucatán Peninsula on June 26. After emerging into the Bay of Campeche, favorable environmental conditions allowed for the development of Tropical Storm Arlene by 18:00 UTC on June 28. Once inland, the center of circulation became increasingly diffuse, and the storm dissipated over the Sierra Madre Mountains early on July 1.

Numerous tropical cyclone watches and warnings were issued for the coastline of Mexico shortly after the formation of Arlene; once inland, all were discontinued. High amounts of precipitation led to numerous mudslides and flooding, causing an estimated $223.4 million in damage. A total of 22 deaths were reported in association with Tropical Storm Arlene. Although the center of circulation remained over Mexico, the storm's far-reaching effects brought minimal relief to drought-stricken portions of southern Texas and Florida.

Tropical Storm Bret

An area of low pressure formed on the southern extent of a stalled cold front just off the East Coast of the United States on July 16. Tracking south-southeast, the low-pressure center was initially baroclinic in nature, but quickly transitioned into a warm-core low over the warm waters of the western Atlantic. Decreasing vertical wind shear allowed for the development of convection – shower and thunderstorm activity – atop the low-level circulation, and Dvorak satellite classifications were initiated early on July 17 given the organization on satellite imagery. After about six hours, the depression intensified into Tropical Storm Bret.

As the system turned northeastward, the formation of an anticyclone atop Bret's center provided favorable conditions for intensification; accordingly, an eye-like feature and an eyewall – a ring of thunderstorms around the eye where typically the most intense convection associated with a tropical cyclone is located – were noted on microwave satellite imagery during the afternoon hours of July 18. After moving over increasingly cool sea surface temperatures, the cyclone began to gradually weaken. Bret left minimal impact in the Bahamas, with rainfall alleviating drought conditions. Precipitation was also generally beneficial on Bermuda, though minor flooding affected some local businesses in poor-drainage areas.

Tropical Storm Cindy

Tracking east-northeastward, the system gradually organized and became better defined. At 06:00 UTC on July 20, the low developed into a tropical depression east of Bermuda. Embedded within the mid-latitude westerlies, the depression moved northeast and maintained this general direction for the remainder of its existence.

Six hours after formation, the system strengthened into Tropical Storm Cindy. Convection steadily increased over the storm, and a ragged eye-like feature appeared on both visible and microwave satellite imagery. The remnants persisted for another 12 hours before degenerating into a trough over the North Atlantic on July 23.

Tropical Storm Don

A tropical wave emerged off the western coast of Africa on July 16. Tracking westward, the disturbance produced sporadic convection, but remained disorganized through its passage into the Caribbean on July 23. Once there, showers and thunderstorms began to develop within an environment marginally conducive for tropical cyclogenesis. A broad area of low pressure formed and consolidated over the northwestern Caribbean Sea, and the NHC subsequently designated Tropical Depression Four on July 27; the system further intensified into Tropical Storm Don at 18:00 UTC. Despite low shear, Don was met with a significantly more stable environment as it emerged into the Gulf of Mexico.

Convection around the center of the storm gradually diminished as a result of a lack of vertical instability, and a decrease in sustained winds was observed accordingly. Don weakened to a tropical depression as it moved ashore in Texas, along the Padre Island National Seashore, and continued west-northwestward thereafter; the system degenerated into a remnant area of low pressure by 06:00 UTC on July 30. As a tropical cyclone, Don prompted tropical cyclone advisories for the southern Texas coastline. No damage was reported.

Tropical Storm Emily

A tropical wave emerged off the west coast of Africa on July 25. Tracking westward, the disturbance gradually consolidated as multiple centers of circulation eventually dissipated and a new one formed. A marginally favorable atmospheric environment allowed for convection to develop, and a reconnaissance aircraft flight into the system led to the classification of Tropical Storm Emily around 00:00 UTC on August 2 near Dominica. Turning west-northwestward along the southwest edge of a large subtropical ridge to its northeast, Emily remained relatively disorganized on satellite imagery due to strong westerly wind shear. Despite a large burst of convection south of Hispaniola on August 3, the center of circulation accelerated west-northwestward, with a mid-level center moving inland over the island. At 18:00 UTC the following day, Emily degenerated into a tropical wave.

The mid-level remnants of Emily continued northwestward, with a new area of low pressure developing over the Bahamas. The low regenerated into a tropical depression at 18:00 UTC on August 6; six hours later, it re-intensified into Tropical Storm Emily. However, strong wind shear exposed the center of circulation once again. At 12:00 UTC on August 7, Emily degenerated into a remnant area of low pressure northeast of the Bahamas. Heavy rainfall and landslides in Martinique damaged 29 homes. One indirect death was reported on the island. In Puerto Rico, flooding and mudslides damaged roads, homes, and crops. Additionally, around 18,500 people lost electricity after winds damaged an electrical grid. About $5 million in infrastructural damage occurred. In Dominican Republic, flooding and mudslides left 56 communities isolated and caused three people to drown. Flooding in Haiti damaged over 300 homes and destroyed several cholera treatment centers. One death occurred in the country.

Tropical Storm Franklin

A low-pressure area developed in association with a slow-moving frontal boundary over western Atlantic on August 10 and August 11. Tracking northeastward in response to deep southeasterly flow, the disturbance was initially slow to organize, but a marked organization of thunderstorm activity took place on August 12. The system brought unsettled weather to island, with rainfall reaching  at L.F. Wade International Airport. Moving northeastward, the depression intensified into Tropical Storm Franklin at 06:00 UTC on August 13, following a large burst of convection over its center. Rapid deterioration of the storm's structure took place as environmental conditions became increasingly hostile, with convection being sheared well away from the center. Franklin began acquiring extratropical characteristics and completed its transition into an extratropical cyclone late on August 13. The remnants degenerated into a trough of low pressure early on August 16.

Tropical Storm Gert

During the second week of August, a weak low-pressure area, located east of Bermuda, became associated with a synoptic-scale trough. Moving west-southwestward, it interacted with an upper low and eventually developed into a small low pressure by August 13. As the depression curved west-northwestward along the weakening subtropical ridge, it intensified into Tropical Storm Gert early on August 14. As Gert neared Bermuda, a small eye-like feature became apparent on radar imagery. The remnant low dissipated well east of Newfoundland on August 17.

Tropical Storm Harvey

On August 10, a tropical wave emerged into the Atlantic from the west coast of Africa. Tracking over the warm waters of the northwestern Caribbean, the depression strengthened into Tropical Storm Harvey while just offshore Honduras. Additional intensification occurred, with Harvey attaining its peak intensity with winds of  prior to landfall in Belize on August 20. Harvey weakened to a tropical depression on August 21, but re-intensified to a tropical storm after emerging into the Bay of Campeche. Early on August 22, it made landfall near Punta Roca Partida, Veracruz, then weakened and dissipated several hours later.

The precursor disturbance produced squally weather and gusty winds throughout the Lesser Antilles. On Saint Croix in the United States Virgin Islands, gusty winds downed trees, which struck power lines, leaving minor electrical outages. Along its path, Harvey dropped heavy rainfall across much of Central America. Strong winds and heavy precipitation were reported in Belize, damaging or destroying homes in Crooked Tree. A tornado in northern Belize also caused wind damage in a few villages. Heavy rains in Mexico triggered numerous landslides, one of which killed three people. Two other fatalities occurred in the country. Landslides and overflowing rivers damaged 36 homes and 334 homes in the states of Chiapas and Veracruz, respectively.

Hurricane Irene

The storm made landfall in Saint Croix as a strong tropical storm later that day. Early on August 21, the storm struck Puerto Rico. While crossing the island, Irene strengthened into a Category 1 hurricane. The storm moved parallel to the coast of Hispaniola, continuing to slowly intensify in the process. Shortly before making four landfalls in the Bahamas, Irene peaked as a  Category 3 hurricane. Thereafter, the storm slowly weakened as it struck the Bahamas and then curved northward after passing east of Grand Bahama. Irene was downgraded to a Category 1 hurricane before making landfall near Cape Lookout, North Carolina, on August 27. Early on the following day, the storm re-emerged into the Atlantic from southeastern Virginia. Although the cyclone remained a hurricane over water, it weakened to a strong tropical storm while making landfall at Little Egg Inlet in New Jersey on August 28. A few hours later, Irene struck Brooklyn, New York City, while slightly weaker. Early on August 29, Irene became extratropical near the New Hampshire–Vermont state line, before being absorbed by a frontal system over Labrador on August 30.

In Puerto Rico, heavy rainfall caused several rivers burst their banks, damaging roads and crops, particularly in Maunabo and Yabucoa. One death occurred after a woman attempted to drive across a bridge over a rain-swollen river, but her car was swept away. Strong winds toppled many trees and utility poles, leaving over 1 million people without electricity. Overall, damage in Puerto Rico totaled approximately $500 million. In Dominican Republic, flooding displaced more than 37,700 people and left at least 88 communities isolated. A total of 2,292 homes were damaged, 16 of which were rendered beyond repair. Throughout the country, there were five deaths and about $30 million in damage. In Haiti, brisk winds in the Port-au-Prince area blew down many refuge tents home to victims from the major 2010 earthquake. Two people were killed after being caught in rain-swollen rivers. In the Bahamas, strong winds damaged at least 40 homes on Mayaguana, while dozens of homes on Acklins were destroyed. On Cat Island, the storm caused "millions of dollars" in structural damage and left many people homeless. Damage throughout the Bahamas reached about $40 million.

Irene impacted the East Coast of the United States from Florida to Maine. Rough seas along the coast of Florida resulted in minor beach erosion and the deaths of two people. Overall, damage in Florida, Georgia, and South Carolina was minimal. Eastern North Carolina was lashed with heavy rainfall, strong winds, and abnormally high tides. In all, over 1,100 homes were destroyed and thousands of others were damaged in North Carolina. Damage in the state reached about $1.2 billion. New Jersey was also hit hard by flooding, strong winds, and storm surge. A number of rivers and creeks reached record or near record levels. Winds left approximately 1.6 million people without electricity. About 200,000 buildings and homes across the state suffered some degree of damage. The cost of damage throughout the state was approximately $1 billion. In New York, winds left almost 350,000 homes and businesses without power in Nassau and Suffolk counties alone, but the state received only minor wind damage overall. Storm surge left hundreds of millions in damage in New York City and on Long Island. Severe flooding occurred in the Catskill Mountains region, with three towns rendered completely uninhabitable. Damage in the state of New York was estimated at over $1.3 billion. Approximately 800 homes were damaged or destroyed. Additionally, nearly 2,400 roads and 300 bridges were damaged or washed away, several of which were covered bridges built more than 100 years prior to the storm. Flooding in Vermont was considered the worst since the flood of November 1927, with uninsured losses alone reaching about $733 million. The other states of New England experienced extensive flooding, but to a less degree. The storm left at least 58 deaths and about $15.8 billion in damage in the United States, which makes it the seventh costliest hurricane in the country. The remnants of Irene also brought flooding to Canada, especially Quebec. One death and about $130 million in insured damage were reported.

Tropical Depression Ten

A well-organized tropical wave moved into the eastern Atlantic on August 22. Tracking westward at a fast pace, the wave gradually developed shower and thunderstorm activity and a closed center of low pressure. As a mid-level ridge to the north of the cyclone weakened, it turned west-northwest while gradually weakening. By late on August 26, little convection existed over the center of circulation. At 00:00 UTC on August 27, the depression degenerated into a remnant area of low pressure and dissipated a few hours later after the center deteriorated into a trough.

Tropical Storm Jose

A mesoscale convective system developed north of an upper-level low east-southeast of Bermuda on August 25. A small mid-level area of low pressure formed on the western side of the convective complex later that same day, gradually developing into the lower levels of the atmosphere. As convection near the center of circulation increased in coverage and intensity, the system developed into a tropical depression at 06:00 UTC on August 27. Six hours later, the depression intensified into Tropical Storm Jose. After formation, strong wind shear from nearby Hurricane Irene slowed, and eventually halted, development trends. As a tropical cyclone, Jose produced tropical storm-force wind gusts on the island and several nearby buoys.

Hurricane Katia

It intensified into a tropical storm the following day and further developed into a hurricane by September 1, although unfavorable atmospheric conditions hindered strengthening thereafter. However, internal core processes, increased wind shear, an impinging cold front, and increasingly cool ocean temperatures caused the cyclone to weaken almost immediately. At 00:00 UTC on September 13, Katia's remnant merged with a larger extratropical system, over the North Sea.

Although Katia passed well north of the Lesser Antilles, a yellow alert was hoisted for Guadeloupe to notify residents of dangerous seas. Strong rip currents along the East Coast of the United States led to the deaths of two swimmers. After losing its tropical characteristics, Katia prompted the issuance of numerous warnings across Europe. Hurricane-force winds impacted numerous locations, downing trees and power poles, leaving thousands of people without electricity. The storm was responsible for two deaths in the United Kingdom, with one from when a tree fell on a vehicle in County Durham and another during a multi-car accident on the M54 motorway resulting from adverse weather conditions. The post-tropical cyclone caused approximately £100m ($157 million) in damage in the United Kingdom alone.

Unnamed tropical storm

As part of their routine post-season analysis, the NHC identified an additional tropical storm. In late August, an area of convection that formed to the southwest of Bermuda organized into a distinct low-pressure area. It initially drifted erratically northeastward due to its position within a stationary front. Despite moderate southwesterly wind shear, the depression intensified into a tropical storm after about 12 hours, based on an increase of convection over the center.

The thunderstorms continued to pulsate, resulting in the winds fluctuating slightly. Additionally, the intermittent nature of the convection, as well as uncertainty on whether it was associated with a cold front, prevented the storm from being classified as a tropical cyclone in real time. On September 2, a Tropical Weather Outlook (TWO) by the NHC stated that "only a slight increase in organization [would] result in the formation of a tropical storm." That day, an approaching trough caused the storm to accelerate northeastward. Cooler waters and increased wind shear stripped away the convection, resulting in the storm becoming extratropical early on September 3. The remnants continued northeastward, with the circulation dissipating by September 4.

Tropical Storm Lee

About 12 hours later, the depression intensified into Tropical Storm Lee. The cyclone moved slowly north-northwestward and continued to strengthen. However, Lee transitioned into a subtropical storm at 12:00 UTC on September 3 due to a significantly expanded wind field, further interaction with an upper-level low pressure, and weak convection near the center. Lee weakened slightly before making landfall near Intracoastal City, Louisiana, at 10:30 UTC on September 4. After moving inland, the storm moved northeastward and merged with a cold front over eastern Louisiana early on September 5. The remnant low dissipated over Georgia by late on the following day.

In Louisiana, storm surge from Lake Pontchartrain flooded more than 150 homes in Jefferson and St. Tammany parishes. Several roads were inundated, while 35 roads were damaged, 5 of which were washed out, in Neshoba County, Mississippi. The storm spawned 46 tornadoes, one of which damaged about 400 homes in Cherokee County, Georgia. About 100,000 people in Pennsylvania evacuated, including the governor's residence. In Dauphin and Lebanon counties alone, nearly 5,000 dwellings were damaged or demolished. Extensive flooding also occurred in western New York, particularly in Binghamton, Endicott, Johnson City, Owego, Vestal, and Waverly. Overall, Lee resulted in 21 deaths and about $1.6 billion in damage.

Hurricane Maria

Early the following day, the depression strengthened into Tropical Storm Maria. It slowly curved toward the north and northeast around the western periphery of the subtropical ridge, and regained tropical storm status on September 10. Maria further strengthened to attain hurricane status while making its closest approach to Bermuda. Maria made landfall near Cape St. Mary's, Newfoundland, on September 16, before being absorbed by a frontal system later that day.

Despite its poor organization, Maria brought heavy rainfall to portions of the eastern Caribbean, especially Puerto Rico. Numerous roadways and homes were flooded, with 150 dwellings in the Yabucoa area receiving water damage. Many people were forced to evacuate after water and mud began entering their homes. Nearly 16,000 people were without electricity in Puerto Rico. Maria left approximately $1.36 million in damage on the island. In addition, tropical storm-force winds were observed on many of the U. S. Virgin Islands. As the system passed west of Bermuda, brief tropical storm-force sustained winds were recorded, along with higher gusts; rainfall on the island, however, was minimal. In Newfoundland, fairly strong winds were recorded, but rainfall totals were generally minimal.

Hurricane Nate

On September 5 and September 6, a frontal trough stalled in the Bay of Campeche. A low developed and organized sufficiently to be designated as Tropical Storm Nate at 18:00 UTC on September 7. Moving in an erratic motion at a very slow pace, Nate continued to strengthen. Due to the storm's slow movement, Nate began to upwell cooler waters in its wake, while very dry air began entering into the storm, resulting in weakening. Shortly after making landfall, much of Nate's showers and thunderstorms diminished, with the system generating into a remnant low by 00:00 UTC on September 12, which dissipated about six hours later.

In the Bay of Campeche, 10 oil rig workers evacuated the Trinity II rig, but were forced to abandon their lifeboat. Seven of the ten were rescued, though the other four perished. One person died in the state after being struck by lightning.

Hurricane Ophelia

As the storm entered a region of higher wind shear it began to weaken, and was subsequently downgraded to a remnant low on September 25. The following day, however, the remnants of the system began to reorganize as wind shear lessened, and on September 27, the system became a tropical depression again. This peak was short-lived however as the system passed over cooler water temperatures and into an area of high wind shear, causing it to quickly weaken and undergo transition to an extratropical cyclone. Ophelia weakened to a tropical storm early on October 3, and became fully extratropical shortly after. The extratropical low was absorbed by a larger weather system on the following day.

Light precipitation totals and gusty winds below tropical storm force were observed on Bermuda, while storm surge and dangerous rip currents along the coast caused minimal damage. In Newfoundland, heavy rainfall contributed to floods that destroyed roads and exposed the inadequacy of some repair work in the aftermath of Hurricane Igor, which struck the previous year. In the northern regions of Ireland, a combination of moisture and significantly cooler weather produced several inches of snow, leaving hundreds without electricity.

Hurricane Philippe

On September 23, a well-defined tropical wave emerged off the coast of Africa, associated with plentiful shower and thunderstorm activity. Moving westward and embedded within a favorable environment for development, the wave quickly became organized. Later that day, the depression intensified into Tropical Storm Philippe. Strong wind shear from upper-level winds and later on from Ophelia's outflow, as well as periodic entrainment of dry air, kept the cyclone both small and disorganized. Additionally, the low-level circulation was often exposed. Because of this hostile environment, Philippe remained near the minimum for a tropical storm and briefly weakened to a tropical depression on September 28.

The storm began to strengthen significantly by October 1, with an Advanced Scatterometer (ASCAT) pass on the following day confirming that Philippe was a strong tropical storm, contrary to satellite estimates. Despite high wind shear, it briefly strengthened to a hurricane on October 4 when it developed an eye feature, before weakening back to a tropical storm several hours later. Philippe re-acquired hurricane intensity on October 6 and peaked with maximum sustained winds of  later that day. However, Philippe weakened to a tropical storm on October 8, before transitioning into an extratropical cyclone later that day. Early on October 9, the remnants extratropical storm was absorbed by larger low-pressure area to the west of the Azores.

Hurricane Rina

A tropical wave emerged into the Atlantic from the west coast of Africa on October 9. After reaching the southwestern Caribbean, convection intensified near the center and organized into a broad low on October 21, possibly due to a cold front that moved into the region. The depression moved northward into a weakness in a ridge near Florida, caused by a broad mid-level trough over the Southeastern United States. Initially, the depression intensified gradually, becoming Tropical Storm Rina early on October 24. After a decrease in easterly wind shear, however, Rina rapidly deepened while crossing warm waters, reaching hurricane status at 18:00 UTC on October 24 and becoming a major hurricane about 24 hours later.

After the storm reaching peak intensity, upper-level winds and wind shear quickly became unfavorable, weakening Rina to a Category 2 later on October 26. While moving west-northwest and northward along the western periphery of the ridge, the cyclone weakened to a tropical storm on October 27. Later that day, Rina curved northward. The storm left little impact in the Yucatán Peninsula due to its weakened state. Rina degenerated into a remnant low late on October 28, upon emerging into the Yucatán Channel. The remnant low dissipated near the western tip of Cuba on October 29. Farther north, two tornadoes touched down in the vicinity of Hobe Sound, one of which damaged 42 mobile homes, 2 vehicles, and a number of trees.

Tropical Storm Sean

While convection and the wind field had become more symmetric, the system remained a subtropical cyclone due to the associated upper-level low. Within 12 hours, Sean separated from the low and transitioned into a tropical cyclone, after developing a warm core. It developed outflow and intensified due to light wind shear, combined with sufficiently warm water temperatures of at least . With a ridge to the northeast, the storm moved slowly to the west. On November 9, an eye feature developed in association with Sean, which later morphed into a ring of convection. An approaching cold front subsequently induced higher wind shear on the cyclone as it tracked northeastward into cooler waters; this led to weakening. Sean transitioned into an extratropical cyclone on November 11. Early on the next day, it was absorbed by the cold front.

Sean and its precursor produced light rainfall for several days in Bermuda. Shortly after development, the Bermuda Weather Service issued a tropical storm watch, which was later upgraded to a tropical storm warning. The storm produced rough seas to the east coast of Florida, which drowned one swimmer in Jensen Beach. Rip currents were also observed in North Carolina.

Storm names
The following list of names was used for named storms that formed in the North Atlantic in 2011. The names not retired from this list were used again in the 2017 season. This was the same list used in the 2005 season with the exceptions of Don, Katia, Rina, Sean, and Whitney, which replaced Dennis, Katrina, Rita, Stan, and Wilma, respectively. The names Don, Katia, Rina, and Sean were used for the first time this year.

Retirement

On April 13, 2012, at the 34th Session of the RA IV hurricane committee, the World Meteorological Organization retired the name Irene from its rotating name lists due to its significant impacts in the United States. It was replaced with Irma for the 2017 season.

Season effects
This is a table of all of the storms that formed in the 2011 Atlantic hurricane season. It includes their duration, names, intensities, areas affected, damages, and death totals. Deaths in parentheses are additional and indirect (an example of an indirect death would be a traffic accident), but were still related to that storm. Damage and deaths include totals while the storm was extratropical, a wave, or a low, and all of the damage figures are in 2011 USD.

See also

 Tropical cyclones in 2011
 List of Atlantic hurricanes
 Atlantic hurricane season
 2011 Pacific hurricane season
 2011 Pacific typhoon season
 2011 North Indian Ocean cyclone season
 South-West Indian Ocean cyclone seasons: 2010–11, 2011–12
 Australian region cyclone seasons: 2010–11, 2011–12
 South Pacific cyclone seasons: 2010–11, 2011–12
 South Atlantic tropical cyclone
 Mediterranean tropical-like cyclone
 Tropical Storm Rolf

Notes

References

External links
 HPC rainfall page for 2011 Tropical Cyclones
 National Hurricane Center Website

 
Atlantic hurricane seasons
Articles which contain graphical timelines
2011 Atl